Calamity Anne's Vanity is a 1913 American silent short Western film directed by Allan Dwan. It stars Louise Lester as Calamity Anne, with J. Warren Kerrigan and Charlotte Burton.

Cast
 Louise Lester as Calamity Anne
 J. Warren Kerrigan
 Charlotte Burton
 Robert Lane
 Rose Lathan
 Jack Richardson
 Jessalyn Van Trump

External links
 

1913 films
1913 Western (genre) films
American silent short films
American black-and-white films
Vanity
Films directed by Allan Dwan
Silent American Western (genre) films
1910s American films